Rocky Mountain Rangers is a 1940 American Western "Three Mesquiteers" B-movie directed by George Sherman and starring Robert Livingston, Raymond Hatton, and Duncan Renaldo.

Cast
 Robert Livingston as Stony Brooke
 Raymond Hatton as Rusty Joslin
 Duncan Renaldo as Renaldo
 Rosella Towne as Doris Manners
 Sammy McKim as Danny Burke
 LeRoy Mason as King Barton
 Pat O'Malley as Captain Taylor
 Dennis Moore as Jim Barton
 John St. Polis as Joseph Manners
 Robert Blair as Sergeant Bush
 Burr Caruth as John
 Jack Kirk as Henchman Harris

References

External links
 

1940 films
1940 Western (genre) films
American Western (genre) films
1940s English-language films
American black-and-white films
Films directed by George Sherman
Republic Pictures films
Three Mesquiteers films
1940s American films